Jorge Fernández Menéndez is a Mexican journalist.

Works
Jorge Fernández Menéndez, a specialist in subversive movements has written the books: 
Asesinato de un cardenal: ganancia de pescadores
El otro poder: Las redes del narcotráfico, la política y violencia in México City
De los maras a los zetas: Los secretos del narcotráfico de Colombia a Chicago
Nadie supo nada: La verdadera historia del asesinato de Eugenio Garza Sada
Calderón presidente: La lucha por el poder

Radio work
Jorge Fernández Menéndez has an important program in Imagen radio station located in 90.5 F.M. in México City and also a TV program named "nada personal" in Proyecto 40.

Awards and recognition
In 2000, Menéndez was awarded the Premio Nacional de Periodismo, a national award of Mexico, for an editorial he wrote.

References

Mexican journalists
Male journalists
Living people
Year of birth missing (living people)